Sacar is a charity in Bradford, West Yorkshire, England, which seeks to support people with autism spectrum disorders.

It aims to enable people with Asperger syndrome or autism to lead a normal, independent life and to help them to integrate into the community.

References

External links

1999 establishments in England
Autism-related organisations in the United Kingdom
Charities based in West Yorkshire
Health charities in England
Organisations based in Bradford
Organizations established in 1999